Alfred or Alf Freeman may refer to:

 Tich Freeman (1888–1965), English cricketer for Kent and England
 Alfred Freeman (Essex cricketer) (1892–1972), English cricketer
 Alf Freeman (footballer, born 1904) (1904–1966), English footballer (Lincoln City)
 Alf Freeman (footballer, born 1920) (1920–2006), English footballer (Southampton)
 Alfred Alexander Freeman (1838–1926), American politician, judge and diplomat